Peter Wynn (19312017) was an English mathematician. His main achievements concern approximation theory – in particular the theory of Padé approximants – and its application in numerical methods for improving the rate of convergence of sequences of real numbers.

Publications

 
 
 
 
 
 
 
 
 
 
 
 
 
 
 
 
 
 
 
 
 
 
 
 
 
 
 
 
 
 
 
 
 
 
 
 
 
 
 
 
 
 
 
 
 
 
 
 
 
 
 

MathSciNet entries

Reference Book 
 C. Brezinski and M. Redivo-Zaglia: "The genesis and early developments of Aitken’s process, Shanks' transformation, the epsilon algorithm, and related fixed point methods", Numer. Algorithms, vol.80 (2019) pp.11-133.
 C. Brezinski: "Reminiscences of Peter Wynn", Numer. Algorithms, vol.80 (2019) pp.5–11.
 C. Brezinski and M. Redivo-Zaglia: ”Extrapolation and rational interpolation, the works of the main contributors”, Springer, 2020.

External links 
 

1932 births
2017 deaths
People from Hertford
20th-century German mathematicians

Johannes Gutenberg University Mainz alumni

The Legacy of Peter Wynn 
Peter Wynn 
Claude Brezinski, Michela Redivo-Zaglia: "Extrapolation and Rational Approximation: The Works of the Main Contributors", Springer Nature, Cham, Switzerland(2020).